Methyldibromo glutaronitrile (MDBGN) is a widely used preservative.

It is made by reacting bromine with 2-methyleneglutaronitrile below 30 °C. An allergy to the chemical can be discovered by performing a patch test.

History and allergy
In the mid-1980s, a maximum concentration of 0.1% in stay-on and rinse-off cosmetics was allowed. It was discovered soon afterwards that it caused allergic contact dermatitis to people with eczema.

It has been in use since the 1990s as a preservative in skin care products such as lotions, wet wipes, shampoo, and liquid soaps. Industrial applications include its use in preserving oils, glues, and medical gels.

In 2005, the EU banned its use in stay-on products, and in 2007 banned it in rinse-off products.

In 2005–06, methyldibromoglutaronitrile/ phenoxyethanol was the ninth-most-prevalent allergen in patch tests (5.8%).

References

External links
Patient information sheet

Preservatives
Nitriles
Organobromides